The Brussels Agreement (formally the International Agreement respecting Facilities to be given to Merchant Seamen for the Treatment of Venereal Diseases) is a 1924 multilateral treaty whereby states agreed to provide free or low-cost medical facilities in ports where merchant seamen could be treated for sexually transmitted diseases.

The Agreement was widely ratified and its effects were studied by a 1958 World Health Organization (WHO) study group. The WHO determined that the Agreement had been successful at improving the health of merchant seamen. The treaty remains in force for 70 states. It was most recently ratified by Papua New Guinea, in 1977.

Belgium is the official depositary for the treaty.

References

 World Health Organization, The Agreement of Brussels, 1924, respecting Facilities to be given to Merchant Seamen for the Treatment of Venereal Diseases: Report of a Study Group (WHO Technical Report Series, No. 150., 1958).
  Ratifications, official depositary information.

1924 in Belgium
Health treaties
Sexually transmitted diseases and infections
Treaties concluded in 1924
Treaties entered into force in 1925
Treaties extended to French Algeria
Treaties of Australia
Treaties of the Bahamas
Treaties of Barbados
Treaties of Belize
Treaties of Belgium
Treaties of the Republic of Dahomey
Treaties of Brazil
Treaties of Burkina Faso
Treaties of the French protectorate of Cambodia
Treaties of Cameroon
Treaties of Canada
Treaties of Chad
Treaties of Chile
Treaties of Cyprus
Treaties of the Republic of the Congo
Treaties of the Republic of the Congo (Léopoldville)
Treaties of Ivory Coast
Treaties of Denmark
Treaties of Dominica
Treaties of the Central African Republic
Treaties of Francoist Spain
Treaties of Fiji
Treaties of Finland
Treaties of the French Third Republic
Treaties of Gabon
Treaties of the Gambia
Treaties of Nazi Germany
Treaties of the Second Hellenic Republic
Treaties of Grenada
Treaties of Guinea
Treaties of Guyana
Treaties extended to British Hong Kong
Treaties of India
Treaties of Mandatory Iraq
Treaties of the Irish Free State
Treaties of Iceland
Treaties of Israel
Treaties of Italy
Treaties of Jamaica
Treaties of Kiribati
Treaties of the Kingdom of Laos
Treaties of Madagascar
Treaties of the Federation of Malaya
Treaties of Morocco
Treaties of Mauritius
Treaties of Mauritania
Treaties of Monaco
Treaties of the Netherlands
Treaties of Niger
Treaties of Norway
Treaties of New Zealand
Treaties of Pakistan
Treaties of Papua New Guinea
Treaties of the Second Polish Republic
Treaties of the Kingdom of Romania
Treaties of Saint Kitts and Nevis
Treaties of Saint Lucia
Treaties of Saint Vincent and the Grenadines
Treaties of Senegal
Treaties of Seychelles
Treaties of the Solomon Islands
Treaties extended to British Ceylon
Treaties of Sweden
Treaties of Tunisia
Treaties of Turkey
Treaties of Tuvalu
Treaties of the United Kingdom
Treaties of the State of Vietnam
Treaties of Yugoslavia
Treaties extended to the Colony of the Bahamas
Treaties extended to the Colony of Barbados
Treaties extended to French West Africa
Treaties extended to the Colony of North Borneo
Treaties extended to French Cameroon
Treaties extended to British Cyprus
Treaties extended to Greenland
Treaties extended to the Faroe Islands
Treaties extended to British Dominica
Treaties extended to the Colony of Fiji
Treaties extended to Martinique
Treaties extended to French Polynesia
Treaties extended to Guadeloupe
Treaties extended to the Gambia Colony and Protectorate
Treaties extended to the British Leeward Islands
Treaties extended to the British Windward Islands
Treaties extended to British Guiana
Treaties extended to the Colony of Jamaica
Treaties extended to French Indochina
Treaties extended to the Gilbert and Ellice Islands
Treaties extended to French Madagascar
Treaties extended to French Morocco
Treaties extended to British Mauritius
Treaties extended to French Equatorial Africa
Treaties extended to the Falkland Islands
Treaties extended to Gibraltar
Treaties extended to British Honduras
Treaties extended to the Crown Colony of Seychelles
Treaties extended to the British Solomon Islands
Treaties extended to the French Protectorate of Tunisia
Treaties extended to the Belgian Congo
Treaties extended to Canada
Treaties extended to Spanish Guinea
Treaties extended to Spanish Sahara
Treaties extended to the Spanish Protectorate in Morocco
Treaties extended to New Zealand
Venereal disease legislation